Jean Davignon,  (born July 29, 1935) is a Canadian physician, medical researcher, and academic.

Born in Montreal, Quebec, he received his Doctor of Medicine from the Université de Montréal in 1958 and a Master of Science degree in 1960 from McGill University.

His research has focused on hyperlipidemia and atherosclerosis. He is the Director of the Hyperlipidemia and Atherosclerosis Research Group of the Institut de recherches cliniques de Montréal (IRCM). He is a professor of the Faculty of Medicine at the Université de Montréal and adjunct professor of the Department of Experimental Medicine at McGill University. He is the co-founder of the Canadian Atherosclerosis Society and the Canadian Association for Familial Hypercholesterolemia.

In 1995, he was made an Officer of the Order of Canada, Canada's highest civilian honour. In 2006, he was made a Grand Officer of the National Order of Quebec.  In 2000, he was awarded the Quebec Government's Prix Wilder-Penfield. In 1995, he was made a Fellow of the Royal Society of Canada. Davignon died August 15, 2021.

References
 
 

1935 births
Canadian medical researchers
Physicians from Montreal
Fellows of the Royal Society of Canada
Grand Officers of the National Order of Quebec
Officers of the Order of Canada
McGill University alumni
Academic staff of McGill University
Academic staff of the Université de Montréal
Université de Montréal alumni
Living people